Debbie Greene (born 24 February 1962) is a Bahamian sprinter. She competed in the women's 4 × 100 metres relay at the 1984 Summer Olympics.

References

External links
 

1962 births
Living people
Athletes (track and field) at the 1984 Summer Olympics
Bahamian female sprinters
Olympic athletes of the Bahamas
Place of birth missing (living people)
Central American and Caribbean Games medalists in athletics
Olympic female sprinters